Dendrobium senile, commonly known as the white-haired dendrobium or old man orchid, is a species of flowering plant in the family Orchidaceae. It  is native to Indochina (Thailand, Vietnam, Laos, Myanmar).

References

External links

senile
Flora of Indo-China
Plants described in 1865